Ntondozi is an inkhundla of Eswatini, located in the Manzini District.  Its population as of the 2007 census was 14,768.

References
Constituencies of Swaziland. Statoids.com. Retrieved December 11, 2010.

Populated places in Manzini Region